Antiochus III the Great (c. 2413 July 187 BC) was a Greek Hellenistic king and the 6th ruler of the Seleucid Empire, reigning from 222 to 187 BC. He ruled over the region of Syria and large parts of the rest of western Asia towards the end of the 3rd century BC. Rising to the throne at the age of eighteen in 222 BC, his early campaigns against the Ptolemaic Kingdom were unsuccessful, but in the following years Antiochus gained several military victories and substantially expanded the empire's territory. His traditional designation, the Great, reflects an epithet he assumed. He also assumed the title Basileus Megas (Greek for "Great King"), the traditional title of the Persian kings. A militarily active ruler, Antiochus restored much of the territory of the Seleucid Empire, before suffering a serious setback, towards the end of his reign, in his war against Rome.

Declaring himself the "champion of Greek freedom against Roman domination", Antiochus III waged a four-year war against the Roman Republic beginning in mainland Greece in the autumn of 192 BC before being decisively defeated at the Battle of Magnesia. He died three years later on campaign in the east.

Biography

Background and early reign

Antiochus III was a member of the Hellenistic Seleucid dynasty. He was the son of king Seleucus II Callinicus and Laodice II, aunt of Seleucus, and was born around 242 BC near Susa in Persia. He may have borne a non-dynastic name (starting with Ly-), according to a Babylonian chronicle. He succeeded, under the name Antiochus, his brother Seleucus III Ceraunus, upon the latter's murder in Anatolia; he was in Babylon at the time.

Antiochus III inherited a disorganized state. Not only had Asia Minor become detached, but the easternmost provinces had broken away, Bactria under the Seleucid Diodotus of Bactria, and Parthia under the rebel satrap Andragoras in 247–245 BC, who was himself later vanquished by the nomad chieftain Arsaces. In 222 BC, soon after Antiochus's accession, Media and Persis revolted under their governors, the brothers Molon and Alexander. The young king, under the influence of the minister Hermeias, headed an attack on Ptolemaic Syria instead of going in person to face the rebels. The attack against the Ptolemaic empire proved a fiasco, and the generals sent against Molon and Alexander met with disaster. Only in Asia Minor, where the king's cousin, Achaeus, represented the Seleucid cause, did its prestige recover, driving the Pergamene power back to its earlier limits.

In 221 BC Antiochus at last went far east, and the rebellion of Molon and Alexander collapsed which Polybios attributes in part to his following the advice of Zeuxis rather than Hermeias. The submission of Lesser Media, which had asserted its independence under Artabazanes, followed. Antiochus rid himself of Hermeias by assassination and returned to Syria (220 BC). Meanwhile, Achaeus himself had revolted and assumed the title of king in Asia Minor. Since, however, his power was not well enough grounded to allow an attack on Syria, Antiochus considered that he might leave Achaeus for the present and renew his attempt on Ptolemaic Syria.

Early wars against other Hellenistic rulers

The campaigns of 219 BC and 218 BC carried the Seleucid armies almost to the confines of the Ptolemaic Kingdom, but in 217 BC Ptolemy IV defeated Antiochus at the Battle of Raphia. This defeat nullified all Antiochus's successes and compelled him to withdraw north of Lebanon. In 216 BC his army marched into western Anatolia to suppress the local rebellion led by Antiochus's own cousin Achaeus, and had by 214 BC driven him from the field into Sardis. Capturing Achaeus, Antiochus had him executed. The citadel managed to hold out until 213 BC under Achaeus's widow Laodice who surrendered later.

Having thus recovered the central part of Asia Minor (for the Seleucid government had perforce to tolerate the dynasties in Pergamon, Bithynia and Cappadocia), Antiochus turned to recovering the outlying provinces of the north and east. He besieged Xerxes of Armenia in 212 BC, who had refused to pay tribute, and forced his capitulation. In 209 BC Antiochus invaded Parthia, occupied the capital Hecatompylos and pushed forward into Hyrcania, winning the Battle of Mount Labus. The Parthian king Arsaces II apparently successfully sued for peace.

Bactrian campaign and Indian expedition
The year 209 BC saw Antiochus in Bactria, where the Greco-Bactrian king Euthydemus I had supplanted the original rebel. Antiochus again met with success. Euthydemus was defeated by Antiochus at the Battle of the Arius but after sustaining a famous siege in his capital Bactra (Balkh), he obtained an honourable peace by which Antiochus promised Euthydemus's son Demetrius the hand of Laodice, his daughter.

Antiochus next, following in the steps of Alexander, crossed into the Kabul valley, reaching the realm of Indian king Sophagasenus and returned west by way of Seistan and Kerman (206/5). According to Polybius:

Persia and Coele Syria campaigns

From Seleucia on the Tigris he led a short expedition down the Persian Gulf against the Gerrhaeans of the Arabian coast (205 BC/204 BC). Antiochus seemed to have restored the Seleucid empire in the east, which earned him the title of "the Great" (Antiochos Megas). In 205/204 BC the infant Ptolemy V Epiphanes succeeded to the Egyptian throne, and Antiochus is said (notably by Polybius) to have concluded a secret pact with Philip V of Macedon for the partition of the Ptolemaic possessions. Under the terms of this pact, Macedon was to receive the Ptolemaic possessions around the Aegean Sea and Cyrene, while Antiochus would annex Cyprus and Egypt.

Once more Antiochus attacked the Ptolemaic province of Coele Syria and Phoenicia, and by 199 BC he seems to have had possession of it before the Aetolian leader Scopas recovered it for Ptolemy. But that recovery proved brief, for in 198 BC Antiochus defeated Scopas at the Battle of Panium, near the sources of the Jordan, a battle which marks the end of Ptolemaic rule in Judea.

War against Rome and death

Antiochus then moved to Asia Minor, by land and by sea, to secure the coast towns which belonged to the remnants of Ptolemaic overseas dominions and the independent Greek cities. This enterprise earned him the antagonism of the Roman Republic, since Smyrna and Lampsacus appealed to the Republic, which at the time acted as a defender of Greek freedom. The tension grew when Antiochus in 196 BC established a footing in Thrace. The evacuation of Greece by the Romans gave Antiochus his opportunity, and he now had the fugitive Hannibal at his court to urge him on.

In 192 BC Antiochus invaded Greece with a 10,000-man army, and was elected the commander in chief of the Aetolian League. In 191 BC, however, the Romans under Manius Acilius Glabrio routed him at Thermopylae, forcing him to withdraw to Asia Minor. The Romans followed up their success by invading Anatolia, and the decisive victory of Scipio Asiaticus at Magnesia ad Sipylum (190 BC), following the defeat of Hannibal at sea off Side, delivered Asia Minor into their hands.

By the Treaty of Apamea (188 BC) Antiochus abandoned all the country north and west of the Taurus, most of which the Roman Republic gave either to Rhodes or to the Attalid ruler Eumenes II, its allies (many Greek cities were left free). As a consequence of this blow to the Seleucid power, the outlying provinces of the empire, recovered by Antiochus, reasserted their independence. Antiochus mounted a fresh eastern expedition in Luristan, where he was killed while pillaging a temple of Bel at Elymaïs, Persia, in 187 BC.

Family

In 222 BC, Antiochus III married Princess Laodice of Pontus, a daughter of King Mithridates II of Pontus and Princess Laodice of the Seleucid Empire. The couple were first cousins through their mutual grandfather, Antiochus II Theos. Antiochus and Laodice had eight children (three sons and five daughters):
Antiochus (221–193 BC), Antiochus III's first heir apparent and joint-king with his father from 210–193 BC
Seleucus IV Philopator (c. 220175 BC), Antiochus III's successor
Ardys
unnamed daughter, betrothed in about 206 BC to Demetrius I of Bactria
Laodice IV, married all three of her brothers in succession and became Queen of the Seleucid Empire through her second and third marriages
Cleopatra I Syra (c. 204176 BC), married in 193 BC Ptolemy V Epiphanes of Egypt
Antiochis, married in 194 BC King Ariarathes IV of Cappadocia
Mithridates (215–164 BC), succeeded his brother Seleucus IV Philopator in 175 BC under the regnal name Antiochus IV Epiphanes

In 191 BC, Antiochus III married a girl from Chalcis, whom he named  "Euboea".  They had no children. Laodice III may have fallen in disgrace; however, she clearly survived Antiochus III, and appears in Susa in 183 BC.

Antiochus and the Jews
Antiochus III resettled 2000 Jewish families from Babylonia into the Hellenistic Anatolian regions of Lydia and Phrygia. Josephus portrays him as friendly towards the Jews of Jerusalem and cognizant of their loyalty to him (see Antiquities of the Jews, Book XII, Chapter 3), in stark contrast to the attitude of his son. In fact, Antiochus III lowered taxes, granted subventions to the Temple, and let the Jews live, as Josephus puts it, "according to the law of their forefathers."

Books of Maccabees 
Antiochus III is mentioned in the deuterocanonical Books of the Maccabees. The subject of Maccabees is the Maccabean Revolt against Antiochus' son, Antiochus IV Epiphanes. Antiochus III is first mentioned in 1 Maccabees 1:10, when Antiochus IV is introduced as "son of King Antiochus [Antiochus III]". Antiochus III is mentioned later in 1 Maccabees 8, which describes Judas Maccabeus' knowledge of the deeds of the Roman Republic, including an allusion to the defeat of Antiochus III by the Romans. The NRSV says "They [the Romans] also had defeated Antiochus the Great, king of Asia, who went to fight against them with one hundred twenty elephants and with cavalry and chariots and a very large army. He was crushed by them; they took him alive and decreed that he and those who would reign after him should pay a heavy tribute and give hostages and surrender some of their best provinces, the countries of India, Media, and Lydia. These they took from him and gave to King Eumenes." (1 Maccabees 8:6-8)

Cultural portrayals
The Caroline era play Believe as You List is centered around Antiochus's resistance to the Romans after the Battle of Thermopylae. The play was originally about Sebastian of Portugal surviving the Battle of Alcazar and returning, trying to gather support to return to the throne. This first version was censored for being considered "subversive" because it portrayed Sebastian being deposed, its comments in favor of an Anglo-Spanish alliance and possible pro-Catholicism, which led to the final version changing to the story of Antiochus (which led to historical inaccuracy in exaggerating his defeat at that phase in history to fit the earlier text), turning Spaniards into Romans and the Catholic eremite into a Stoic philosopher.
Antiochus features towards the end of Norman Barrow's historical novel, The High Priest (Faber & Faber, 1947), after his forces have reacquired Jerusalem from the Ptolemaic occupation. The book was noted by John Betjeman in the Daily Herald (UK newspaper) as "interesting".

See also

 List of Syrian monarchs
 Timeline of Syrian history

Notes

References

External links

Antiochus III "the Great" entry in historical sourcebook by Mahlon H. Smith
Antiochus III entry in 'Seleucid Genealogy' 

240s BC births
187 BC deaths
Year of birth uncertain
3rd-century BC Babylonian kings
2nd-century BC Babylonian kings
3rd-century BC Seleucid rulers
2nd-century BC Seleucid rulers
People from Khuzestan Province
Kings of Syria